The 1951–52 Scottish Districts season is a record of all the rugby union matches for Scotland's district teams.

History

Glasgow District beat Edinburgh District in the Inter-City match.

This season's dates included a touring South Africa side.

Results

Inter-City

Glasgow District:

Edinburgh District:

Other Scottish matches

Midlands District:

North of Scotland District: 

Glasgow District:

Rest of the West: 

Edinburgh District:

South of Scotland District: 

South of Scotland District:

North of Scotland District: 

West of Scotland District:

East of Scotland District: 

Highlands:

Glasgow District:

English matches

Durham County:

South of Scotland District:

Trial matches

Blues Trial:

Whites Trial: 

Blues Trial:

Whites Trial:

International matches

Cities District:

South Africa: 

North of Scotland District:

South Africa: 

South of Scotland District:

South Africa:

References

1951–52 in Scottish rugby union
Scottish Districts seasons